Erpetogomphus designatus, the eastern ringtail, is a species of clubtail in the dragonfly family Gomphidae. It is found in Central America and North America.

The IUCN conservation status of Erpetogomphus designatus is "LC", least concern, with no immediate threat to the species' survival. The population is stable. The IUCN status was reviewed in 2017.

References

Further reading

External links

 

Gomphidae
Articles created by Qbugbot
Insects described in 1858